"Everything Is Embarrassing" is a song by American singer Sky Ferreira from her second extended play (EP), Ghost (2012). It was first premiered online on August 30, 2012, and was later released as a single on April 16, 2013, by Capitol Records in the United Kingdom and Ireland. The song was written by Ferreira, Ariel Rechtshaid, and Dev Hynes, while the latter two produced the track. An accompanying music video for "Everything Is Embarrassing" was directed by Grant Singer with no budget; it was premiered through Pitchfork on October 1, 2012, and sees Ferreira singing in various locations throughout Los Angeles.

"Everything Is Embarrassing" was widely acclaimed and hailed by music critics as one of the best songs of recent years. In 2015, Pitchfork placed the song at number 14 on its list of "The 200 Best Tracks of 2010–2014". In 2019, Pitchfork placed the song at number 12 on its list of "The 200 Best Songs of the 2010s".

Composition
"Everything Is Embarrassing" is a synth-pop, electropop, dance-pop, alternative pop, and synth-rock ballad. It was written by Ferreira, Ariel Rechtshaid, and Dev Hynes, while the latter two produced and co-produced the track, respectively. Hynes, a former friend of Ferreira, had sent her a demo of the song, which was inspired by a failed relationship; Ferreira then modified the original lyrics and structure along with Rechtshaid.

Release and promotion

Single release 
With her debut studio album having been frequently delayed throughout the early 2010s, Ferreira released her second extended play Ghost on October 2, 2012, while simultaneously continuing production of her full-length record. "Everything Is Embarrassing" appears as the fifth of five songs on the track listing. The track was premiered through Pitchfork on August 30, 2012, and was later released as a single in the United Kingdom on April 16, 2013. It was later included on the compilation album Now That's What I Call Music! 46 compilation album, released on May 7, 2013. Remixes by Twin Shadow and Krystal Klear were released digitally on February 5 and March 25, 2013, respectively, while a remix by Unknown Mortal Orchestra was included on Ferreira's third extended play Night Time, My Time: B-Sides Part 1, released on November 25, 2013.

In her debut television performance, she performed the track on Late Night with Jimmy Fallon on January 7, 2013. She has also performed the track at the SXSW festival.

As of July 2013, "Everything Is Embarrassing" had sold 19,000 copies in the United States, according to Nielsen SoundScan. In Belgium, the song peaked at numbers 20 and 46 the Flanders and Wallonia Ultratip charts, respectively.

Media appearance 
The main protagonist of the Special series on Netflix, Ryan Hayes (portrayed by Ryan O'Connell), in the first episode of season 2 says Sky Ferreira is his "diva of choice" and that "Everything Is Embarrassing" is "a perfect pop song." The song was featured in episode 5.

Critical response
"Everything Is Embarrassing" was met with acclaim from music critics. The single was named "Best New Track" by Pitchfork the day following its premiere In his review of Ghost, Jon Caramanica of The New York Times called the song "counterintuitive and brilliant" and "one of the year's unlikely pop gems".

Several publications and music blogs listed the song among the best of 2012, including Pitchfork, The Guardian, the Los Angeles Times, Billboard, Spin, Fact, the Bangkok Post, and New York, the latter of which named it the best song of the year. It was placed at number fifteen in the 2012 Pazz & Jop critics' poll. In 2014, Pitchfork placed "Everything Is Embarrassing" at number 14 on its list of "The 200 Best Tracks of the Decade So Far (2010–2014)", writing: "[The song] is ostensibly a done-with-your-shit kiss-off, and it's a glorious one", adding "she might be ready to move on, but she's still feeling a million conflicting emotions, and few songs capture that internal strife as honestly and effortlessly as 'Everything Is Embarrassing' does." In 2018, NPR ranked the track as the 149th greatest song by a female or nonbinary artist in the 21st century, saying: Sky Ferreira's 'Everything Is Embarrassing' marked her first foray into pop stardom – by that point, the 20-year-old had a successful career as a model and actress, but this downtrodden dance-pop single produced by 1980s revisionists Dev Hynes and Ariel Rechtshaid ushered in a new musical moment. Ferreira's vocals are impossibly cool, fully embracing the humiliation of anxiety and unfulfilled romances. It's a song that submits to mundane mortifications, the sound of sweet suffering. In 2019, Pitchfork ranked the song at number 12 on its list "The 200 Best Songs of the 2010s". On October 9, 2019 Ferreira in an Instagram post celebrated the recognition by Pitchfork, with a screenshot photo from the list, stating she would be 'releasing new music right before the decade (2010s) is over'.

Music video
Capitol Records requested that an accompanying music video for "Everything Is Embarrassing" with no budget be filmed following the track's online premiere; it was directed by Grant Singer, who had previously directed the clips for Ferreira's tracks "Sad Dream" and "Lost in My Bedroom", and was filmed in one day in Los Angeles before Ferreira was scheduled to depart for New York City shortly after. It was premiered through Pitchfork on October 1, 2012; the black-and-white clip sees Ferreira singing in various locations throughout the city, including a playground, on the Los Angeles Metro and the roof of the Capitol Records Building.

Track listings

Credits and personnel
Credits adapted from the liner notes of Night Time, My Time: B-Sides Part 1.

Recording
 Recorded at Heavy Duty Studios (Los Angeles, California)
 Mixed at Eldorado Recording Studios (Burbank, California)
 Mastered at Capitol Mastering (Hollywood, California)

Personnel
 Sky Ferreira – vocals
 Ariel Rechtshaid – production, recording, keys
 Blood Orange – co-production, keys
 Rich Costey – mixing
 Chris Kasych – Pro Tools engineering
 Mark Santangelo – Pro Tools engineering assistance
 Nick Rowe – editing
 Kevin Bartley – mastering

Charts

Release history

References

2010s ballads
2012 songs
2013 singles
Black-and-white music videos
Capitol Records singles
Electropop ballads
Polydor Records singles
Rock ballads
Sky Ferreira songs
Song recordings produced by Ariel Rechtshaid
Song recordings produced by Dev Hynes
Songs written by Ariel Rechtshaid
Songs written by Dev Hynes
Songs written by Sky Ferreira
Synth-pop ballads
Torch songs